Dorothy Thomas may refer to:

 Dorothy Thomas (activist) (born 1960), American human rights activist
 Dorothy Thomas (entrepreneur) (1756-1846), Afro-Caribbean businesswoman
 Dorothy Thomas (politician) (died 2005), Canadian politician
 Dorothy Louise Thomas (1905–1989), British nurse
 Dorothy Swaine Thomas (1899–1977), American sociologist and economist
 Dorothy Thomas (writer) (1898-1990), American writer